The Grain That Built a Hemisphere is a 1943 short animated propaganda film about corn produced by Walt Disney for the Office of the Coordinator of Inter-American Affairs. It was nominated for an Academy Award for Best Documentary in 1943.

Bibliography

See also
 List of Allied propaganda films of World War II
 World War II and American animation

References

External links
 
 
 
 The Grain That Built a Hemisphere at the National Archives and Records Administration

1943 films
1943 animated films
1940s war films
American World War II propaganda shorts
1940s Disney animated short films
Documentary films about agriculture
Maize
Films directed by Bill Roberts
Films produced by Walt Disney
American black-and-white films